is a Japanese professional racing driver. He participated in three Formula One Grands Prix, débuting in the 1994 European Grand Prix, but did not score any championship points. He replaced Yannick Dalmas in the Larrousse car for the last three Grands Prix of the season, but failed to finish in any of the three races. In 1995, he joined Simtek as a test driver, hoping to get some races in. However, the Kobe earthquake and the folding of the Simtek team ended his brief Formula 1 career.

A year later, Noda went to America and raced in the Indy Lights and became the only Japanese driver to win a CART-sanctioned event. After a few years in America, Noda moved back to Japan, where he drove a Team Cerumo Toyota Supra with Hironori Takeuchi. In the annual non-championship All-Star event at Aida, Noda and Takeuchi were forced out with mechanical problems. In 1999, he joined the Esso Tiger Team Le Mans under Koichiro Mori, again to drive a Toyota Supra, ex-Australian V8 Supercar driver Wayne Gardner. The highlight of their season was a win at Fuji. With 33 points they were equal 17th in the series.

In 2002, Noda returned to the United States and drove in six Indy Racing League IndyCar Series races for Convergent Racing and Indy Regency Racing with a best finish of 10th at Phoenix International Raceway while with Convergent. He also competed in a round of the inaugural A1 Grand Prix season with Japan at Lausitz, where he scored three points for the Japanese team. He has also been seen in the Zytek sports-prototype in 2006.

Career

A1 Grand Prix (2005–2009) 
In 2005, Noda was announced as the second driver for the Japan entry for the 2005-06 A1 Grand Prix season, second to Ryo Fukuda. His first race for the team came at the second round at Lausitz, where he qualified in 21st place. In sprint race, Noda managed to move up 11 places to finish 10th and score one point for Japan. The feature race saw Noda finish one place higher in ninth place, scoring a further two points for the Japanese A1 GP team. Japan finished 21st at the end of the season, with eight points.

Personal life
Noda's daughter Juju is also a racing driver, who currently competes in the W Series.

Racing record

Complete International Formula 3000 results
(key) (Races in bold indicate pole position) (Races in italics indicate fastest lap)

Complete Japanese Formula 3000/Formula Nippon results
(key) (Races in bold indicate pole position) (Races in italics indicate fastest lap)

Complete Formula One results
(key)

American open-wheel racing results
(key) (Races in italics indicate fastest lap)

Indy Lights

Indy Racing League

Complete JGTC/Super GT results
(key) (Races in bold indicate pole position) (Races in italics indicate fastest lap)

24 Hours of Le Mans results

Footnotes

References

All Formula One race and championship results are taken from:
 Official Formula 1 Website. Archive: Results for 1994 season www.formula1.com. Retrieved 7 July 2006
All IRL race and championship results are taken from:
 Official IRL Website. Archive: Results for 2002 season IndyCar.com. Retrieved 7 July 2006

External links

Hideki Noda Official Website 

1969 births
Living people
Japanese racing drivers
Japanese Formula One drivers
Larrousse Formula One drivers
IndyCar Series drivers
Japanese IndyCar Series drivers
Indy Lights drivers
A1 Team Japan drivers
Japanese Formula 3000 Championship drivers
Formula Nippon drivers
International Formula 3000 drivers
24 Hours of Le Mans drivers
American Le Mans Series drivers
European Le Mans Series drivers
Super GT drivers
Asian Le Mans Series drivers
Dandelion Racing drivers
TOM'S drivers
Team LeMans drivers
Alan Docking Racing drivers
A1 Grand Prix drivers
Carlin racing drivers